Viktor Yakovlevich Potapov  (29 March 1947 – 10 December 2017) was a Soviet and  Russian sailor. He won a bronze medal in the Finn class at the 1972 Summer Olympics.

He died in Dolgoprudny as a result of an automobile accident on 10 December 2017.

References

External links
 
 
 

1947 births
2017 deaths
Medalists at the 1972 Summer Olympics
Olympic bronze medalists for the Soviet Union
Olympic medalists in sailing
Olympic sailors of the Soviet Union
People from Dolgoprudny
Road incident deaths in Russia
Russian male sailors (sport)
Sailors at the 1972 Summer Olympics – Finn
Sailors at the 1976 Summer Olympics – 470
Sailors at the 1980 Summer Olympics – Tornado
Soviet male sailors (sport)
World champions in sailing for Russia
Tornado class world champions
Sportspeople from Moscow Oblast